367th may refer to:
367th Fighter Group, later the 133d Operations Group, the flying component of the Minnesota Air National Guard's 133d Airlift Wing
367th Fighter Squadron Inactivated in 1945, then reactivated at Homestead Air Reserve Base in 2015
367th Bombardment Squadron, later the 367th Training Support Squadron, located at Hill Air Force Base, Utah, a component squadron of the 782d Training Group

See also
367 (number)
367, the year 367 (CCCLXVII) of the Julian calendar
367 BC